Connell is a city in Franklin County, Washington, United States. The population was 5,441 at the 2020 census.

History
Prior to 1883 the area now known as Connell was used by ranchers as open range for cattle and horses. The community was established in 1883 as a junction between the Northern Pacific Railroad and the Oregon Railroad and Navigation Company. The new town was called Palouse Junction by Jacob Cornelius Connell, a railroad official and resident. Palouse Junction was unique on the Ainsworth—Spokane line, in that it was not on a river. It was also the gateway to the Palouse via the OR&N's line to Washtucna. Water for trains and for the town was from public wells dug by the railroad. At some time between 1886 and 1900, the town was renamed to Connell.

The Northern Pacific Railroad ceased service to the station in 1890, but the Union Pacific Railroad took over the station in 1901, and the town began to grow again. A school district was formed sometime between 1900 and 1904. In 1902 the Franklin County Bank was Incorporated in Connell, and the Connell Land and Improvement Company was established. Also in that year, the county allowed a franchisee to begin piping in water for the town (Although this was never very successful, and the following year a good well hit water at 268 feet).  In 1903, lots on the west side of the tracks were sold, and a new commercial district began to grow, and a number of existing buildings were even moved to these new lots.

By this time the town rivaled Pasco in importance in Franklin County.  Unfortunately, much of the business district was destroyed by fire in July 1905. The destroyed sections were quickly rebuilt using brick.  Connell was officially incorporated on November 28, 1910.  Dryland wheat farming was the lifeblood of Connell through most of the twentieth century.

Today
The primary industrial base is food processing, agricultural chemicals, and the Coyote Ridge Corrections Center, a minimum and medium-security correctional facility that is capable of holding 2600 offenders. The community is also home to the North Franklin School District where there is a high school, junior high, grade school and administration offices.

In 1998 the city approved a "water system plan" that would include the purchase of additional water rights to secure water for future growth in residential, commercial and industrial activities.  By 2007 the water system plan was completed. New waterlines had been installed to replace aging pipes, reservoirs were upgraded and additional wells were brought into the system.

During the last ten years, the city has rebuilt Columbia Avenue, the main thoroughfare, and reconstructed its industrial streets, and received a grant award to reconstruct a portion of Clark Street. This roadway connects the downtown to Highway 260 on the west side of town, and serves the junior and senior high schools and administration buildings for the school district. Several businesses have left the city (Akins Food, B&H clothing, Tru-Value Hardware and Les Schwab Tire) and very few new businesses have been established.

Government
Connell has a strong-mayor form of city government. In 1989, Connell established the position of city administrator. As of January 2022, the mayor was Lee Barrow, and the city administrator was Cathleen Koch.

Geography
Connell is located at  (46.658300, -118.860842).

The site of the town is located in a depression formed by the convergence of Providence Coulee, coming from the north, Washtucna Coulee from the east, and Esquatzel Coulee to the southeast. Terrain rises a few hundred feet from the floor of the coulees to the higher land surrounding Connell. Ephemeral streams flow through these coulees. U.S. Route 395 passes through Connell, connecting the town with Interstate 90 at Ritzville to the northeast and Interstate 82 at the Tri-Cities to the southwest. State Route 260 begins a few miles west of Connell and passes through the town as it heads east along Washtucna Coulee to Washtucna.

Climate

According to the Köppen Climate Classification system, Connell has a semi-arid climate, abbreviated "BSk" on climate maps.
It is the least snowy city in Eastern Washington, on average.

Demographics

2010 census
As of the census of 2010, there were 4,209 people, 878 households, and 689 families residing in the city. The racial makeup of the city was 73.4% White, 6.4% African American, 1.9% Native American, 2.7% Asian, 0.4% Pacific Islander, 12.2% from other races, and 3.0% from two or more races. Hispanic or Latino of any race were 39.3% of the population.

There were 878 households, of which 50.5% had children under the age of 18 living with them, 55.2% were married couples living together, 15.3% had a female householder with no husband present, 8.0% had a male householder with no wife present, and 21.5% were non-families. 19.5% of all households were made up of individuals, and 5.9% had someone living alone who was 65 years of age or older. The average household size was 3.14 and the average family size was 3.53.

The median age in the city was 32.5 years. 23.7% of residents were under the age of 18; 10.3% were between the ages of 18 and 24; 37.6% were from 25 to 44; 22.8% were from 45 to 64; and 5.4% were 65 years of age or older. The gender makeup of the city was 67.5% male and 32.5% female.

2000 census
As of the census of 2000, there were 2,956 people, 766 households, and 602 families residing in the city. The population density was 1,034.8 people per square mile (399.1/km2). There were 891 housing units at an average density of 311.9 per square mile (120.3/km2). The racial makeup of the city was 63.19% White, 3.92% African American, 1.12% Native American, 4.36% Asian, 0.03% Pacific Islander, 21.52% from other races, and 5.85% from two or more races. Hispanic or Latino of any race were 41.47% of the population.

There were 766 households, out of which 48.8% had children under the age of 18 living with them, 61.1% were married couples living together, 11.4% had a female householder with no husband present, and 21.3% were non-families. 17.4% of all households were made up of individuals, and 7.6% had someone living alone who was 65 years of age or older. The average household size was 3.17 and the average family size was 3.59.

In the city, the age distribution of the population shows 31.4% under the age of 18, 12.2% from 18 to 24, 32.4% from 25 to 44, 18.3% from 45 to 64, and 5.7% who were 65 years of age or older. The median age was 29 years. For every 100 females, there were 142.9 males. For every 100 females age 18 and over, there were 160.3 males.

The median income for a household in the city was $33,992, and the median income for a family was $38,309. Males had a median income of $30,129 versus $24,444 for females. The per capita income for the city was $12,600. About 15.9% of families and 19.5% of the population were below the poverty line, including 26.7% of those under age 18 and 9.6% of those age 65 or over.

References

External links
 City of Connell

Cities in Washington (state)
Cities in Franklin County, Washington